Caroline Ticknor, (1866-1937) (aged 70) was an American biographer and short story writer. During her lifetime, she published biographies of Nathaniel Hawthorne and Louisa May Alcott, among others.

Early life 
Ticknor was born in Boston, Massachusetts in 1866. Her parents were Benjamin H. Ticknor and Caroline Cushman Ticknor. Her paternal grandfather was William Ticknor, co-founder of the publishing house Ticknor and Fields.

Ticknor reportedly began writing at the age of eighteen.

Career 
In 1898, Ticknor became an editor of the International Library of Famous Literature. In addition to books, Ticknor also published short stories in several magazines, including The Atlantic, Cosmopolitan, and New England Magazine.

Bibliography 

 A hypocritical romance, and other stories (1896)
 Miss Belladonna; a child of to-day (1897)
 "The Steel-Engraving Lady and the Gibson Girl," The Atlantic (1901)
 Miss Belladonna; a social satire (1902)
 A poet in exile; early letters of John Hay (1910, with Bruce Rogers and John Henry Nash)
 Hawthorne and His Publisher (1913, about Nathaniel Hawthorne and William Ticknor)
 Poe's Helen (1916, about Sarah Helen Whitman)
 Glimpses of Authors (1922)
 Classic Concord, as portrayed by Emerson, Hawthorne, Thoreau and the Alcotts (1926)
 May Alcott: A Memoir (1928, about Abigail May Alcott Nieriker)

Death 
Ticknor died in her home in Jamaica Plain, Boston on May 11, 1937.

References 

1866 births
1937 deaths
American biographers
19th-century American women writers
Writers from Boston
American short story writers